Xavier Dziekoński (born 6 October 2003) is a Polish professional footballer who plays as a goalkeeper for Garbarnia Kraków, on loan from Raków Częstochowa.

Club career
On 18 June 2020, Dziekoński was submitted to the senior squad of the Ekstraklasa club Jagiellonia Białystok. On 15 July 2020, he made his league debut, in a Jagiellonia's 2–1 victory over Śląsk Wrocław. In September 2020, he was called up for the Poland national under-19 football team for a two-leg game against Denmark.

He was the Ekstraklasa's best young player of February 2021.

On 12 July 2022, Raków Częstochowa announced the signing of Dziekoński, who joined the club on a three-year deal with an extension option. On 17 January 2023, having only appeared for Raków's reserve side in III liga, he was loaned until the end of the season to II liga side Garbarnia Kraków.

Career statistics

Honours
Individual
Ekstraklasa Young Player of the Month: February 2021

References

External links
 
 

2003 births
Living people
Association football goalkeepers
Polish footballers
Poland under-21 international footballers
Ekstraklasa players
III liga players
Jagiellonia Białystok players
Raków Częstochowa players
Garbarnia Kraków players
People from Grajewo